Painful Thing is an EP by English alternative rock band Catherine Wheel, released in May 1991 on Wilde Club Records. The EP was mixed by Simon Davey at Purple Rain Studios in Norfolk.

The EP was released on CD and 12" vinyl and limited to 2,000 copies of each.

The songs were later rerecorded for the band's debut studio album, Ferment (1992).

Track listing
All songs written by Catherine Wheel.

"Shallow" – 3:24
"Spin" – 2:42
"Painful Thing" – 3:58
"I Want to Touch You" – 5:05

Personnel
Catherine Wheel
Rob Dickinson – vocals, guitar
Brian Futter – vocals, guitar
Dave Hawes – bass
Neil Sims – drums, percussion

Technical personnel
Simon Davey – mixing
Alastair Thain – photography

References

External links 

 

1991 EPs
Catherine Wheel albums